Terje Sagvolden (12 February 1945–12 January 2011, Oslo) was a Norwegian behavioral neuroscientist, a professor at the Universities of Oslo and Tromsø, and adjunct professor at the University of Maryland, Baltimore County.

Research
Sagvolden's research career started with his work for his PhD, which he obtained in 1979 from the University of Oslo based on a thesis entitled Behavioral Changes in Rats with Septal Lesions: Effects of Water-Deprivation Level and Intensity of Electrical Shocks. Sagvolden is best known for the discovery that the SHR rat strain is hyperactive. Over the next decades, he then went on to demonstrate that this strain is a valid animal model for attention deficit hyperactivity disorder (ADHD). Subsequently, Sagvolden also showed that the WKY/NCrl rat strain showed inattention, but no impulsivity or hyperactivity, and validated this strain as an animal model of inattentive ADHD. Over the course of his career, Sagvolden worked not only with rats, but also with humans and pigeons.

Editorial activities
Sagvolden was the founding editor-in-chief of the scientific journal Behavioral and Brain Functions, from the time of its establishment in 2005 to his death in 2011. In 1989 he co-edited, together with Trevor Archer, a book summarizing current research on ADHD, followed in 1998 by a special issue on ADHD for Behavioural Brain Research.

Community service 
Sagvolden was a member at large of the executive committee of the European Brain and Behaviour Society from 1986 to 1989 and its secretary from 1990 to 1995. Over the last two decades of his life, he was an active supporter of the Society of Neuroscientists of Africa (SONA) and in 1993 played a significant role in its founding. He was subsequently member of SONA's International Advisory Committee and an official internal adviser from 1999 to 2004. In 2000, Sagvolden organized the first IBRO school in Africa at the University of the North (Pietersburg, South Africa). In addition, Sagvolden was one of the "founding fathers" of the Federation of European Neuroscience Societies, where he represented Norway on the council from the foundation of the federation until his death.

Outside of the scientific community, Sagvolden was also active in local politics. He was a member of the Lier municipal council for the Conservative Municipal Group from 2003 until his death, and served in the areas of health, culture, childhood, education. In 2003, he was one of the top five candidates to run for mayor.

Notable works 
According to the Web of Science, Sagvolden published over 103 articles in peer-reviewed scientific journals. , these articles have been cited over 3400 times, resulting in an h-index of 30. His three most-cited publications (> 185 times) are:

References 

Norwegian journal editors
2011 deaths
Attention deficit hyperactivity disorder researchers
1945 births
Norwegian neuroscientists
University of Maryland, Baltimore County faculty
Academic staff of the University of Oslo
Academic staff of the University of Tromsø
University of Oslo alumni